Richard Van Buren (born Syracuse, New York, 5 August 1937) is an American sculptor and painter. He is an artist who, throughout his lifetime, has tested the boundaries of what sculpture should look like. He was quite active in the New York art world in the 1960s and 1970s, and still continues his art-making practices, though he now lives in Maine. His sculptures and works on paper are best summarized by experimentation between the limits of natural/organic and the man-made/inorganic materials; and he often combines the two in combinations that evoke light and contradict our assumptions.

Biography
Van Buren first studied painting at sculpture at San Francisco State University and the National University of Mexico. While still a student, he began exhibiting in galleries who showed works by his contemporaries, Franz Kline, H.C. Westermann, Ron Nagle, Ed Moses, and Robert Morris. Eventually, he relocated to New York in 1964, where he stayed for over twenty years teaching at the School of Visual Arts and the Parsons School of Design, while also becoming deeply engrained in the contemporary art scene. His colleagues were famous sculptors such as Eva Hesse, Lynda Benglis, and Richard Serra.

Artistic style
Richard Van Buren has displayed a career-long fascination with materials. He often makes use of dry pigment, costume jewelry, fiberglass, wallpaper paste, and glitter simultaneously. His forms are often inconsistent and biomorphic, making use of man-made materials while forming biomorphic constructions.

Exhibitions
He began exhibiting with a solo exhibition in 1961 at New Mission Gallery, San Francisco, and has held solo exhibitions at Bykert Gallery, New York; Paula Cooper Gallery, New York; Graduate Center Mall, City University of New York; Mitchell Algus Gallery, New York; Grand Arts, Kansas City, Missouri; Tides Institute and Museum of Art, Eastport, Maine; Garth Greenan Gallery, New York; and the South Dakota Art Museum, South Dakota State University, Brookings. He was included in group exhibitions at The Jewish Museum, New York; Institute of Contemporary Art, University of Pennsylvania, Philadelphia; Aldrich Museum of Contemporary Art, Ridgefield, Connecticut; Whitney Museum of American Art; Albright-Knox Art Gallery, Buffalo; Art in General, New York; Museum of Fine Arts, Boston; Museum of Contemporary Art, Los Angeles; and the National Gallery of Australia, Canberra.

Collections
American Academy of Arts and Letters, New York
Art Institute of Chicago
Bennington College, Bennington, Vermont
Miami-Dade Art in Public Places
Museum of Contemporary Art, San Diego
Museum of Fine Arts, Boston
Museum of Modern Art, New York
National Gallery of Art, Washington, D.C.
National Gallery of Australia, Canberra
Purdue University, Lafayette, Indiana
Philadelphia Museum of Art
San Francisco Museum of Modern Art
Smithsonian American Art Museum, Washington, D.C.
Virginia Museum of Fine Arts, Richmond
Walker Art Center, Minneapolis

References

American abstract artists
20th-century American painters
20th-century American male artists
American male painters
American male sculptors
1937 births
Painters from New York City
American contemporary painters
Living people
Sculptors from New York (state)